The 1911 UCI Track Cycling World Championships were the World Championship for track cycling. They took place in Rome, Italy in 1911. Four events for men were contested, two for professionals and two for amateurs.

Medal summary

Medal table

References

Track cycling
UCI Track Cycling World Championships by year
International cycle races hosted by Italy
Sports competitions in Rome
1911 in track cycling
1910s in Rome